Senator Bull may refer to:

Benjamin Bull (1798–1879), Wisconsin State Senate
Hiram C. Bull (1820–1879), Wisconsin State Senate
Melville Bull (1854–1909), Rhode Island State Senate
Thomas Short Bull (born 1946), South Dakota State Senate